Alejandro Carlos "Alec" Oxenford is an Argentine entrepreneur. He co-founded OLX, and co-founded letgo, a mobile classified ad app in the United States.

Personal life 
Raised in Argentina, Oxenford received a BA in Business Administration from the Pontifical Catholic University of Argentina and an MBA from Harvard University.

Oxenford is an art collector, focusing on Argentinian artists, such as Liliana Porter, Eduardo Navarro, Carlos Huffmann and Martin Legon. His collection includes about 280 pieces.  In 2013, he became the president of the arteBA Foundation, the nonprofit that organizes the arteBA art fair, a Latin American event.

Career 

He previously worked for the Boston Consulting Group, and was the CEO of DeRemate.com, an online trading platform in Latin America, which sold to eBay.  The story of the company is included in the book Six Billion Shoppers: The Companies Winning the E-Commerce Boom by Peter Erisman. He also co-founded DineroMail.com.

A 2014 article in Fortune Magazine characterized him as a "CEO rock star of sorts" in South America, known for his "staunch contrarianism".

In a 2015 essay in TechCrunch, Oxenford argued that investment in tech companies in emerging markets was dramatically underfunded. In a 2014 essay in Recode, he argued that in the emerging world, instead of "mobile first", users were "mobile only" and the companies which failed to build a "fundamentally mobile option" would be displaced by competitors.

Oxenford received the CNN Internet Leader Award in 2001 and the Entrepreneur Award in 2003. He was elected Young Global Leader by the World Economic Forum in 2006.

Alpha Capital merged with Brazilian software company Semantix in November 2021, giving the combined company an initial valuation of about $1 billion.

OLX 
In 2006,  Oxenford and Fabrice Grinda co-founded OLX, an  online classified ads company that operates in 45 countries, with 330 million users and 60 million listings a month.  In 2010, a majority of the company was acquired by the South African group Naspers, with Oxenford remaining CEO through 2014. The story of Oxenford's founding of OLX is told in the 2017 book Los Nuevos Reyes Argentinos by Sebastián Catalano, with an overview in La Nación.

letgo

Oxenford started letgo in 2015, with co-founders Jordi Castello and Enrique Linares, as a smart-phone focused marketplace for buying and selling used goods in the United States; it had 75 million downloads in 2017.  In September 2015, he raised $100 million in financing to back the company from Naspers, the majority owner of his other company, OLX.   Oxenford raised an additional $100 million in 2016 and merged with competitor Wallapop the same year. Oxenford raised $175 million more for letgo in February 2017. In September, 2017, the company confirmed it had a $1 billion valuation. In March 2020, Oxenford joined the board of OfferUp after it merged with letgo.

Alpha capital 

In December 2020, Oxenford co-founded Alpha Capital, a special-purpose acquisition company, with Rafael Steinhauser, with Oxenford serving as CEO and chairman. Alpha Capital closed a $230 million initial public offering on Nasdaq in February 2021, which Oxenford says will be used to invest in Latin American entrepreneurs.

Myelin II

In 2020, Oxenford co-founded a venture capital fund called Myelin II, which focuses on the Latin American region. The fund was set up with the goal of providing support for 30-50 startup technology businesses in areas such as biotech, financial technology, and medical technology.

References

Argentine businesspeople
Year of birth missing (living people)
Living people
Harvard Business School alumni
Pontifical Catholic University of Argentina alumni
Argentine people of English descent